Zatanna is a comic book miniseries, featuring the character Zatanna, that was created in 2010 by the American screenwriter Paul Dini working with the French artist Stephane Roux. DC Comics launched the miniseries in July 2010, releasing 16 issues until the last one in October 2011.

List of titles 
 Zatanna
 Fuseli's Nightmare
 Night On Devil Mountain
 Playing With Fire!
 Double Or Nothing
 Married In Vegas
 Shades
 Pupaphobia
 Stringleshanks (Includes the history Brace Yourself)
 Strung Along
 Unstrung
 SymmetryyяtэmmyƧ
 The Cat With The Crystal Ball Eye
 Wingman
 Witch Hunt
 The Sorceress' Apprentice

Collected editions
Zatanna by Paul Dini – Zatanna: Everyday Magic, Zatanna #1–12
Zatanna : Mistress of Magic – Zatanna #1–6
Zatanna: Shades of Past – Zatanna #7–12

See also 
 Identity Crisis
 Seven Soldiers of Victory

Notes

References

American comics
DC Comics titles